Plymouth Drake was a borough constituency in the city of Plymouth, in Devon.  It elected one Member of Parliament to the House of Commons of the Parliament of the United Kingdom by the first past the post system of election.

History
The first Drake constituency was created for the 1918 general election, and abolished for the 1950 general election. For most of this time it was held by the Conservative Party. It was a Labour gain in the Attlee landslide of 1945, although it had been held by Labour once before, in the 1929–31 Parliament.

The second incarnation of the constituency was created for the February 1974 general election. For the whole of its 23-year existence it was represented by just one MP, Dame Janet Fookes of the Conservative Party. It was always a marginal seat during this period, but Dame Janet managed to survive many strong challenges at each general election she fought, including winning with a majority of just 34 in October 1974 – making Drake the most marginal Conservative seat at that election. She served as a Deputy Speaker of the House to Betty Boothroyd from 1992 until she retired from the Commons in 1997.

The constituency was abolished for the 1997 general election, with its wards being transferred to the redrawn constituency of Plymouth Sutton, which was gained by the Labour Party in the Blair landslide of that year. Most of the territory of Drake is now covered by the constituency of Plymouth Sutton and Devonport.

Boundaries
1918–1950: The County Borough of Plymouth wards of Drake, Mount Edgcumbe, Mutley, Pennycross, St Peter, Stoke, and Valletort.

1974–1983: The County Borough of Plymouth wards of Compton, Drake, Honicknowle, Pennycross, Tamerton, Trelawny, and Whitleigh.

1983–1997: The City of Plymouth wards of Compton, Drake, St Peter, Stoke, Sutton, and Trelawny.

In its 1918 and 1983 incarnations the constituency included Plymouth city centre, which was transferred in 1997 to Plymouth Sutton and in 2010 to Plymouth Sutton and Devonport.

Members of Parliament

MPs 1918–1950

MPs 1974–1997

Election results

Elections in the 1910s

Elections in the 1920s

Elections in the 1930s

Elections in the 1940s
General Election 1939–40:

Another General Election was required to take place before the end of 1940. The political parties had been making preparations for an election to take place and by the Autumn of 1939, the following candidates had been selected; 
Conservative: Henry Guest
Labour: Leonard Matters

Elections in the 1970s

Elections in the 1980s

Elections in the 1990s

See also
 List of parliamentary constituencies in Devon

Notes and references

Parliamentary constituencies in Devon (historic)
Constituencies of the Parliament of the United Kingdom established in 1918
Constituencies of the Parliament of the United Kingdom disestablished in 1950
Constituencies of the Parliament of the United Kingdom established in 1974
Constituencies of the Parliament of the United Kingdom disestablished in 1997
Politics of Plymouth, Devon
Francis Drake